Stephenospongia is a genus of sponge known from a single specimen in the Trilobite beds of the Burgess Shale.

References

External links 
 

Prehistoric sponge genera
Hexactinellida genera
Burgess Shale sponges

Cambrian genus extinctions